Focus is a Polish popular science monthly magazine which was a print publication between 1995 and 2022. It became online-only publication from February 2022.

History and profile
Focus was first published in September 1995 by Gruner and Jahr Polska and then was owned by Burda Media Polska. The magazine has its headquarters in Warsaw.

It features stories on health, coaching, space exploration, technology, nature, society and history and produces a number of podcasts ran by the members of the editorial team.

See also
 List of magazines in Poland

References

External links
 Official site 

1995 establishments in Poland
2022 disestablishments in Poland
Focus
Focus
Focus
Focus
Focus
Focus
Focus
Online magazines with defunct print editions